The Somali sheep, Somali language: Ido Soomaali occasionally known as the Berbera Blackhead, is a hair sheep native to Djibouti, Somaliland, Ethiopia, Kenya and Somalia.

Overview
The Somali sheep is the direct forebear of the Blackhead Persian, the latter of which was bred in South Africa between the late 19th century to early 20th century and has been extensively used for crossbreeding in many tropical areas. 

The Somali sheep is white with a black head. It belongs to the fat-tail type, and both of the breed's genders are polled. The animal is mainly reared for meat production, and is a major export of the Somali economy, particularly to the Arabian Peninsula, with Burao and Yirowe in central Somaliland being home to the largest livestock markets in the Horn of Africa, with as many as 10,000 heads of sheep and goats sold daily, many of whom shipped to Gulf states via the port of Berbera. The market handles livestock from all over the Horn of Africa.

See also
Somali goat

References

Sheep breeds
Sheep breeds originating in Somalia